The Junior Hockey League (JHL), sometimes translated as the Minor or Youth Hockey League, is a major junior ice hockey league in Eurasia, founded in 2009. It currently consists of 33 teams from 4 countries. Currently, all teams but one are subsidiaries (feeder teams) for their respective KHL or VHL professional counterparts. A player's age cannot be older than 20.  The Kharlamov Cup, named after star ice hockey player Valeri Kharlamov, is awarded annually as the Ice Hockey Federation of Russia's official Junior Championship, following a 16-team playoff at the end of the regular season.

Teams in 2022–23

History

Seasons overview

2009–10 season

In the first MHL season, 22 teams participated, all from Russia. The MHL opened its doors on September 4, 2009 in Moscow, when the first ever MHL game was played between MHC Dynamo (then the junior team of Dynamo Moscow) and CSKA-Red Army (the junior team of CSKA Moscow) with Dynamo picking up the 6–2 victory.

The 2010 Challenge Cup, the all-star game of the MHL, was played on February 6 in the Ice Palace in Saint Petersburg. The Western Conference team defeated the Eastern Conference team 6–4. The last matches of the regular season were played on March 8, 2010. Steel Foxes (the junior team of Metallurg Magnitogorsk) won the Eastern Conference regular season and the overall MHL regular season with 135 points in 54 games. Soviet Wings won the Western Conference regular season with 119 points in 66 games.

The playoffs started on March 13, 2010. No teams of the Western Conference made it past the round of 16 of the playoffs. Steel Foxes and Kuznetskie Medvedi (the junior team of Metallurg Novokuznetsk) reached the playoff finals for the Kharlamov Cup. The first game of the best-of-five series between these two clubs was played on April 21, 2010. Steel Foxes won the first ever Kharlamov Cup after defeating Kuznetsk Bears 3–2 on April 26, 2010 and winning the series 3–1. Belye Medvedi (the junior team of Traktor Chelyabinsk) and Tolpar (the junior team of Salavat Yulaev Ufa) lost the semi-finals series of the playoffs and played in a two-legged tie for the third place. The first match of the tie was played on April 20, 2010 on Belye Medvedi's home ice and the second leg on April 24 on Tolpar's home ice. Tolpar won both games, first 4–2, second 5–2 and clinched third place of the first season of the MHL.

2010–11 season

The number of teams was expanded from 22 in the inaugural season to 29 in the second season. 8 new teams joined the league while Dynamo Moscow's junior team left the league. Sheriff, the junior team of HC MVD in the inaugural season, was moved to Tver and would serve as the junior team of UHC Dynamo in the second season. Phoenix was renamed to MHC Khimik. MHC Krylya Sovetov was reunited with PHC Krylya Sovetov (playing in the VHL) and the MHL team of the newly reunited club was moved to Dmitrov. Among the new teams were teams from Belarus (Minskie Zubry (then the junior team of Dinamo Minsk) and MHC Yunost (the junior team of Yunost Minsk)) and Latvia (HC Riga (the junior team of Dinamo Riga)), thus making the league international. Both conferences were divided into 2 divisions each.

The regular season started on 4 September 2010 in Magnitogorsk with a match for the Opening Cup between last year's Kharlamov Cup playoff finalists Steel Foxes and Kuznetskie Medvedi. Steel Foxes won the match with 8 goals to 1. The 2011 Challenge Cup took place in Ufa on 12 February 2011. As in 2010, the match pitted the best players of the Western Conference on one side against the best players of the Eastern Conference on the other side. In the West, MHC Khimik won the regular season, while in the East, Tolpar Ufa was the winner.

The playoffs were for the first time separate in each conference, with the two winners meeting in the Kharlamov Cup final. In the final, the Red Army team from Moscow defeated the Steel Foxes from Magnitogorsk with a 4–0 sweep.

2011–12 season

For the 2011–12 season, a second division named MHL-B was established, which features mostly junior teams of VHL teams. A relegation and promotion system is in place between the MHL and MHL-B. The number of MHL teams was expanded from 29 to 32. One team, Krylya Sovetov, left the league, while 4 new teams joined: Tatranskí Vlci from Spišská Nová Ves, Slovakia (the junior team of Lev Poprad), Kapitan Stupino from Stupino, Snezhnye Barsy from Astana, Kazakhstan (the junior team of Barys Astana) and Mamonty Yugry from Khanty-Mansiysk (the junior team of Yugra Khanty-Mansiysk). Minskie Zubry were renamed to Dinamo-Shinnik and moved to Babruysk. Sheriff was renamed to MHC MVD and moved from Tver to Balashikha.

The 2012 Challenge Cup took place in Magnitogorsk on 11 February 2012. The first ever Future Cup took place in Chelyabinsk on 13 March 2012 and featured the best under-18 players (not born before 1 January 1994) of both the MHL and the MHL-B division.

The regular season winners were the Omsk Hawks (the junior team of Avangard Omsk) in the East and Almaz Cherepovets (the junior team of Severstal Cherepovets) in the West. Omsk Hawks also made it to the Kharlamov Cup final, where they defeated the Red Army team from Moscow with a 4–1 series win.

2012–13 season
For their fourth season, the MHL expanded to Czech Republic and Hungary, with the junior team of HC Energie Karlovy Vary and Patriot Budapest joining. The two Russian teams Kristall Berdsk and HC Oktan Perm were promoted from MHL-B, while Ladya Togliatti (the junior team of Lada Togliatti) and HC Olimpiya Kirovo-Chepetsk were relegated. Slovak team Tatranskí Vlci withdrew from the league. These changes brought the number of teams up to 33, representing 6 countries.

The Omsk Hawks once again made it to the Kharlamov Cup final, where this time they defeated MHC Spartak (the junior team of Spartak Moscow) from Moscow in 7 games, winning the seventh game in overtime thanks to Kirill Rasskazov. Omsk Hawks also became the first team ever to not only win 2 Kharlamov Cups, but also the first team to ever repeat as Kharlamov Cup champions.

2013–14 season
For the fifth season, the league expanded to 40 teams, divided into two conferences with two divisions each. New teams are the junior team of EC Red Bull Salzburg from Austria, Molodaya Gvardia from Ukraine (the junior team of HC Donbass) and Dinamo Saint Petersburg. Ladya Togliatti, Olimpiya Kirovo-Chepetsk, Junior Kurgan (the junior team of Zauralie Kurgan) and HC Chelny were promoted from MHL-B. Oktan Perm was renamed to "Molot". In September, after the season had already started, Patriot from Hungary withdrew from the league, leaving only 39 teams to play the season.

MHC Spartak achieved redemption this season after falling just short the season before by winning the Kharlamov Cup defeating their rivals, the Red Army team from Moscow, 4–3 in the final.

2014–15 season
For the sixth season, the league went through a number of changes, with 2 teams joining the league and 2 teams leaving, each for different reasons. Due to the War in Donbass, the league stated that Molodaya Gvardia would miss this season. JHC Bars (then the junior team of Ak Bars Kazan) left the league to join the Supreme Hockey League (VHL). Their place as Ak Bars Kazan's junior team would be taken by Irbis. New teams joining the league were an expansion team from Yuzhno-Sakhalinsk called the Sakhalin Sharks as well as Berkuty Kubani Krasnodar from Krasnodar, who were promoted from MHL-B.

Chaika (the junior team of Torpedo Nizhny Novgorod) won the Kharlamov Cup for the first time after defeating SKA-1946 (one of the junior teams of SKA Saint Petersburg) with a 4–1 final series win.

2015–16 season
For the seventh season, the league once again went through some big changes, with both a small number of teams joining the league, but also with a huge number of teams leaving. Those teams leaving included MHC Khimik, who left the league to join the Supreme Hockey League (VHL), the junior team of EC Red Bull Salzburg, the junior team of HC Energie Karlovy Vary, Belye Tigry, Berkuty Kubani Krasnodar, Junior Kurgan, Dinamo-Shinnik and JHC Yunost (the junior team of Yunost Minsk). Meanwhile, new teams joining the league included the Russia U18 squad as well as Sarmaty from Orenburg (the junior team of Yuzhny Ural Orsk) and Dinamo-Raubichi (then the junior team of Dinamo Minsk) from Minsk, Belarus.

Chaika returned to the Kharlamov Cup final, but were not able to repeat as champions, with Loko Yaroslavl (the junior team of Lokomotiv Yaroslavl) winning the series, 4–1.

The first ever (and so far only) Super Cup took place on 30 April 2016 in Uchaly. It was the trophy awarded to the winner of the game between the winner of the Kharlamov Cup (the MHL champions) and the winner of the Regions Cup (the MHL-B champions) and was won by Loko Yaroslavl 5–1 against Gornyak Uchaly.

2016–17 season
For the eighth season, the number of teams in the league was at 31 teams, representing 3 countries (28 from Russia, 2 from Kazakhstan and 1 from Latvia). Teams that left the league were Olimpiya Kirovo-Chepetsk, Dinamo-Raubichi, Russia U18 and the Sakhalin Sharks. Meanwhile, the teams that joined the league were Sputnik Almetyevsk (the junior team of Neftyanik Almetyevsk), expansion club Taifun from Ussuriysk (the junior team of Admiral Vladivostok), Altay Oskemen from Ust-Kamenogorsk, Kazakhstan (the junior team of Torpedo Ust-Kamenogorsk) as well as Krylya Sovetov who were returning to the league after being inactive for five years.

While Reaktor (the junior team of Neftekhimik Nizhnekamsk) dominated both the regular season and the first three rounds of the playoffs, they were not able to continue their success in the Kharlamov Cup final, with the Red Army team taking the series in a 4–0 sweep, winning their second Kharlamov Cup.

2017–18 season
Season nine featured some minor changes with only 2 teams joining the league. Those teams were KRS Junior (the junior team of Kunlun Red Star) from Beijing, China (though they play their home games in Riga, Latvia) and returning Kapitan Stupino (which became the junior team of HC Sochi), thus bringing the number of teams in the league up to 33 once again, this time representing only 4 countries. Meanwhile, MHC MVD was renamed to MHK Dynamo.

International matches

Tour of North America 2010–11
In December 2010 and January 2011, a team composed of players playing in the MHL named the Red Stars toured North America and played 5 games there with the following results:

World Junior Club Cup 2011
The city of Omsk hosted the inaugural Junior Club World Cup from August 30 to September 3, 2011. Krasnaya Armiya won the tournament beating HC Energie Karlovy Vary 7–2 in the final.

Tour of North America 2011–12
As in 2010, the Red Stars, a team made of players who play in the MHL, toured North America. The opponents of the Red Stars were teams from NCAA Division I and the NAHL.

IIHF U20 Challenge Cup of Asia 2012
MHL Red Stars participated in the 2012 IIHF U20 Challenge Cup of Asia, the U20 edition of the IIHF Challenge Cup of Asia. Red Stars won all 4 of their games, with a total of 57–0 goals.

Tour of North America 2012–13

IIHF U20 Challenge Cup of Asia 2013
The MHL Red Stars participated in the 2013 IIHF U20 Challenge Cup of Asia. The tournament was held in Khabarovsk. The Red Stars won the game against South Korea but lost against Japan, finishing second in the tournament.

Tour of North America 2013–14
Game against the Merrimack Warriors cancelled due to severe weather concerns according to North American sources. Game ended 5 goals to 4 after a shootout according to Russian sources.

References

External links
 Official website
Official website
 Official YouTube Channel

 
5
Junior ice hockey in Russia
Sports leagues established in 2009